Allama Ali Khan Abro was a Sindhi scholar and educationist who is known for having written the Sindhi translation of Quran and intended to give the Qur'an a practical contemporary interpretation. He also wrote a translation for non-Muslims at the request of Taj Mahmood Amroti.

Life

Abro attended Sindh Madrasatul Islam and graduated from Bombay University. He had religious education in Hyderabad, where he learned Arabic and English. He then started working as a lecturer. He wrote books on social and literary topics.

References

Pakistani writers
Pakistan Movement activists from Sindh
Sindhi people
Pakistani scholars
20th-century Muslim scholars of Islam
Translators of the Quran into Sindhi
Pakistani Sunni Muslims
Sindh Madressatul Islam University alumni